Mary Robinson Gish ( McConnell; September 16, 1876  – September 17, 1948) was an American actress and the mother of screen stars Lillian and Dorothy Gish.

Life

Mary Gish was born in Dayton, Ohio, as Mary Robinson McConnell. On January 8, 1893, she married James L. Gish (son of David Edwin Gish and Diana Caroline Waltz) in Clark County, Ohio. They were the parents of actresses Lillian and Dorothy.  The girls' father, James Leigh Gish, died on January 9, 1912, when his daughters were 18 and 13 years old. (His christening record dated November 29, 1872, states his name as James Leonidas Gish.) Around the 1890s Mary would operate a concession stand in Fort George Amusement Park in New York City.

In 1917, Mary and her daughters traveled to England and France as members of D. W. Griffith's film company,"Biograph Studios", to make a film at the behest of the British Government. This film was almost certainly Hearts of the World (1918), which featured all three Gishes, rising star Bobby Harron, British Prime Minister Lloyd George, and Griffith himself. The purpose of this film was to change the neutral mindset of the American public regarding World War I.

Films

Two Daughters of Eve (1912)
Judith of Bethulia (1914)
Letters Entangled (1915)
Hearts of the World (1918)

References

Sources

 Affron, Charles (2001). Lillian Gish: Her Legend, Her Life. New York: Scribner.

External links

 

1876 births
1948 deaths
Actresses from Dayton, Ohio